Pravoberezhny District (Raxizfarsy rajon) is an administrative and municipal district (raion), one of the eight in the Republic of North Ossetia–Alania, Russia. It is located in the north of the republic. Its administrative center is the town of Beslan. Population:  55,685 (2002 Census);  The population of Beslan accounts for 64.4% of the district's total population.

Notable residents 

Issa Pliyev (1903—1979), Soviet military commander, born in Stariy Batakoyurt

References

Notes

Sources

Districts of North Ossetia–Alania